Forster is a north English surname meaning "forester". It can also be an anglicization of Förster or Foerster, a German surname meaning the same. Some indigenous south Germans independently carry the name Forster, while East Prussian Forsters are descendants of an 18th century English Forster family. Notable people with this surname include:

 Forster baronets, several persons

A
 Adam Forster (1850–1928), artist
 Albert Forster (1902–1952), German Nazi governor executed for war crimes
 Anthony Forster (disambiguation), several people:
 Anthony Forster (academic), vice-chancellor of the University of Essex
 Anthony Forster (Australian politician) (1813–1897) South Australian MLC and newspaperman
 Anthony Forster (MP), Member of Parliament for Abingdon (UK Parliament constituency) 1566–1572
 Anthony Forster, mayor of Markham, 1889–1892

B
 Beat Forster (born 1983), Swiss ice hockey player
 Benjamin Forster (antiquary) (1736–1805), English antiquary
 Benjamin Meggot Forster (1768–1829), an English botanist and mycologist
 Bill Forster (footballer), played for Crystal Palace
 Brian Forster (born 1960), a TV actor in The Partridge Family
 B. Y. Forster, the pseudonym of American songwriter George David Weiss

C
 Carl-Peter Forster (born 1954), the President of GM Europe
 Sir Charles Forster, 1st Baronet (1815–1891), English Liberal politician 
 Charles Farrar Forster (1848–1894), English priest
 Charles French Blake-Forster (1851–1874), Irish writer 
 Charles Smith Forster (1786–1850), English banker and Conservative politician
 Clara Forster (1789–1839), German papercutting artist, daughter of Georg Forster

E
 Edward Forster the Elder (1730–1812), English banker and antiquary
 Edward Forster the Younger (1765–1849), English banker and botanist, son of Edward Forster the Elder
 E. M. Forster (1879–1970), English novelist

F
 François Forster (1790–1872), French engraver
 Frank Foster (jazz musician) (1928-2011)  American tenor and soprano saxophonist, flautist, arranger, and composer.
 Frank J. Forster (1885-1948) American architect from new York City
 Fraser Forster (born 1988), English football
 Friedrich Forster (1895–1958), German dramatist

G
 Georg Forster (composer) (1510–1568), German Renaissance editor, composer and physician
 Georg Forster (1754–1794), Polish-German botanical collector and artist; son of Johann Reinhold Forster
 George Forster (disambiguation), several persons
 Gisela Forster (born 1946), German teacher, writer and theologian

H
 Henry Forster, 1st Baron Forster (1866–1936), Governor-General of Australia

J
 Jack Forster (born 1987), English rugby union player
 Jackie Forster (1926–1998), TV reporter and member of the Minorities Research Group
 Jean Forster (born 1943), Australian basketball player
 Jill Forster (born 1936), Australian actress
 Johann Reinhold Forster, (1729–1798), Polish-born naturalist of German and Scottish descent 
 John Forster (disambiguation), several persons
 Sir John Forster (soldier) (1520–1602), English military commander and Warden of the Middle Marches
 John Forster (biographer) (1812–1876), English biographer and critic
 John Forster (MP) (1817–1878), British politician, MP for Oxford
 John Forster (Chief Justice) (1667–1720), Irish lawyer and politician
 John Forster (colonial administrator) (died 1748), British administrator and President of Bengal
 John Forster, 1st Baron Forster of Harraby (1888–1972), British barrister  
 John Forster (died 1558), English politician
 John Forster (footballer) (born 1948), Australian footballer
 John Forster (musician) (born 1948), American cabaret musician
 John Forster (British Army officer) (1856–1938), British Army officer
 John Cooper Forster (1823–1886), British surgeon
 John (Don Juan) Forster (1814–1882), California landowner
 John Wycliffe Lowes Forster (1850–1938), Canadian artist
 Jordon Forster (born 1993), Scottish footballer
 Josiah Forster (1782–1870), teacher and philanthropist

K
 Kaye Forster (born 1980), English weather presenter
 Kevin Forster (born 1958), English long-distance runner

L 
 Lyn Forster (1925–2009), New Zealand arachnologist

M
 Marc Forster (born 1969), Swiss film director and screenwriter
 Margaret Forster (1938–2016), British author and literary critic
 Mark Forster (author), British author
 Mark Forster (rugby league), former professional rugby league footballer
 Mark Arnold-Forster (1920–1981), journalist, author and military historian
 Markus Forster, Austrian countertenor
 Martin Onslow Forster (1872–1945), British chemist

N
 Nick Forster, founder of eTown (radio program) radio program
 Nicky Forster (born 1973), English footballer
 Norvela Forster (1931–1993), English businesswoman

P
 Peter Forster (actor) (1920–1982), British film and television actor
 Peter Forster (bishop) (born 1950), British Anglican bishop
 Peter Forster (geneticist) (born 1967), British geneticist

R
 Ray Forster (1922–2000), New Zealand arachnologist
 Richard Forster (physician) (c.1546–1616), English physician
 Richard Forster (photographer) (born 1940), Swiss photographer
 Robert Forster (1941–2019), American actor
 Robert Forster (musician) (born 1957), Australian musician, member of The Go-Betweens
 Roger T. Forster (born 1933), theologian and leader of Ichthus Christian Fellowship

S
 Susanna Dorothy (Forster) Dixon (1757-1822), author and translator
 Stuart Forster, father and husband (1982-). Once thought the moon was 2 dimensional.

T
 Therese Forster (disambiguation), two people:
 Therese Forster (1764-1829), German author and journal editor, wife of Georg Forster
 Therese Forster (1786-1862), German educator, daughter of Georg and Therese Forster 
 Thomas Forster (1683–1738), Northumbrian Jacobite 
 Thomas Furly Forster (1761–1825), English botanist
 Thomas Emerson Forster (1802–1875), English mining engineer
 Thomas Ignatius Maria Forster (1789–1860), astronomer and naturalist
 Tim Forster (1934–1999), British racehorse trainer and amateur jockey

W
 Walter Forster (disambiguation), several names
 Walter Forster (actor) (1917–1996), Brazilian actor
 Walter Forster (entomologist) (W. Forster, 1910–1986), German entomologist
 Walter Forster (screenwriter) (1900–1968), Austrian screenwriter
 William Forster (disambiguation), other men of that name
 William Thomas Forster (or Thomas William Forster), politician in British Columbia
 William Forster (Australian politician) (1818–1882), Premier of New South Wales and poet
 William Forster (bishop) (died 1635), Church of England bishop of Sodor and Man
 William Forster (British Army officer) (1798–1870) British Army Officer
 William Forster (cricketer) (1884–1930), Australian cricketer
 William Forster (English politician), MP for Berkshire in 1572–1576
 William Forster (judge) (1921–1997), first Chief Justice of the Northern Territory
 William Forster (mathematician) (fl. 1632–1673), English mathematician
 William Forster (philanthropist) (1784–1854), Quaker preacher and philanthropist
 William Forster (Australian politician) (1818–1882), Premier of New South Wales and poet
 William Edward Forster (1818–1886), British statesman, Liberal MP, and Chief Secretary for Ireland
 William Mark Forster (1846–1921), Australian philanthropist

See also 
 Förster
 Forester (disambiguation)
 Forrester (surname)
 Foster (disambiguation)
 Fosters (disambiguation)
 Vorster

English-language surnames